Ryan Healy (born July 20, 1983) is a retired American professional mixed martial artist who has competed for many promotions including Strikeforce, WEC, Shine Fights, and Full Contact Fighting Federation. He is also the twin brother of mixed-martial artist and Team Quest teammate Pat Healy.

Mixed martial arts career

Bellator 
After Rob Sinclair injured his knee and was forced out of his lightweight tournament fight, Sinclair was replaced by Ricardo Tirloni and Healy took Tirloni's spot and faced Marcin Held at Bellator 101. He lost the fight via knockout in the first round.

Mixed martial arts record

|-
| Loss
| align=center| 25–14–1
| Andrew McInnes
| Submission (rear-naked choke)
| MFC 41: All In
| 
| align=center| 1
| align=center| 2:49
| Edmonton, Alberta, Canada
|
|-
| Win
| align=center| 25–13–1
| Aaron Hedrick
| TKO (punches)
| WFC 25: Brawl at the Beach
| 
| align=center| 2
| align=center| 3:13
| Lincoln City, Oregon, United States
| 
|-
| Win
| align=center| 24–13–1
| Alex Ricci
| Decision (split)
| PFC 2
| 
| align=center| 3
| align=center| 5:00
| London, Ontario, Canada
| 
|-
| Loss
| align=center| 23–13–1
| Marcin Held
| KO (punches)
| Bellator 101
| 
| align=center| 1
| align=center| 1:12
| Portland, Oregon, United States
| 
|-
| Loss
| align=center| 23–12–1
| Jesse Ronson
| Decision (unanimous)
| Score Fighting Series 7
| 
| align=center| 3
| align=center| 5:00
| Hamilton, Ontario, Canada
| 
|-
| Win
| align=center| 23–11–1
| Paul Kelly
| Decision (unanimous)
| SFL 2
| 
| align=center| 3
| align=center| 5:00
| Chandigarh, India
| 
|-
| Loss
| align=center| 22–11–1
| John Alessio
| Decision (unanimous)
| Score Fighting Series 4
| 
| align=center| 3
| align=center| 5:00
| Hamilton, Ontario, Canada
| 
|-
| Win
| align=center| 22–10–1
| Andrew Chappelle
| Decision (split)
| SportFight 30: Limitless
| 
| align=center| 3
| align=center| 5:00
| Gresham, Oregon, United States
|Catchweight (160 lb) bout.
|-
| Win
| align=center| 21–10–1
| James Birdsley
| TKO (punches)
| FNE- Round 14: Combat at the Cabaret
| 
| align=center| 2
| align=center| 1:04
| Anacortes, Washington, United States
| 
|-
| Loss
| align=center| 20–10–1
| Vener Galiev
| TKO (punches)
| Fight Festival 30
| 
| align=center| 1
| align=center| 0:43
| Helsinki, Uusimaa, Finland
| 
|-
| Loss
| align=center| 20–9–1
| Kajan Johnson
| Decision (unanimous)
| MFC 27
| 
| align=center| 3
| align=center| 5:00
| Enoch, Alberta, Canada
|Catchweight (158 lb) bout; Healy missed weight.
|-
| Win
| align=center| 20–8–1
| Eddie Pelczynski
| Decision (unanimous)
| CageSport 12
| 
| align=center| 3
| align=center| 5:00
| Tacoma, Washington, United States
| 
|-
| Win
| align=center| 19–8–1
| Charon Spain
| Submission (rear-naked choke)
| Conquest of the Cage 9
| 
| align=center| 2
| align=center| N/A
| Airway Heights, Washington, United States
| 
|-
| Win
| align=center| 18–8–1
| Lance Wipf
| Decision (split)
| Budo Fights 2: Evolution
| 
| align=center| 3
| align=center| 5:00
| Bend, Oregon, United States
| 
|-
| Win
| align=center| 17–8–1
| Dave Courchaine
| KO (knee)
| CageSport 11
| 
| align=center| 1
| align=center| 3:20
| Tacoma, Washington, United States
| 
|-
| Win
| align=center| 16–8–1
| Jai Bradney
| TKO (doctor stoppage)
| CFC 12: Lombard vs. Santore
| 
| align=center| 2
| align=center| 5:00
| Sydney, Australia
| 
|-
| Win
| align=center| 15–8–1
| Rod Montoya
| TKO (punches)
| Hoosier FC 1: Raise Up
| 
| align=center| 1
| align=center| 4:59
| Valparaiso, Indiana, United States
| 
|-
| Loss
| align=center| 14–8–1
| Lloyd Woodard
| Decision (unanimous)
| Cage Sport 7
| 
| align=center| 3
| align=center| 5:00
| Tacoma, Washington, United States
| 
|-
| Loss
| align=center| 14–7–1
| Luiz Firmino
| Decision (unanimous)
| Shine Fights 2: ATT vs. The World
| 
| align=center| 3
| align=center| 5:00
| Miami, Florida, United States
| 
|-
| Loss
| align=center| 14–6–1
| Jameel Massouh
| Decision (unanimous)
| Evolution MMA
| 
| align=center| 3
| align=center| 5:00
| Phoenix, Arizona, United States
| 
|-
| Loss
| align=center| 14–5–1
| Rick Story
| Decision (unanimous)
| EWC: May Massacre
| 
| align=center| 5
| align=center| 5:00
| Salem, Oregon, United States
|Welterweight bout; for the EWC Welterweight Championship.
|-
| Loss
| align=center| 14–4–1
| Jorge Masvidal
| Decision (unanimous)
| Strikeforce: At The Dome
| 
| align=center| 3
| align=center| 5:00
| Tacoma, Washington, United States
|Catchweight (160 lb) bout.
|-
| Win
| align=center| 14–3–1
| Ryan Bixler
| TKO (punches)
| Ringside Ticket
| 
| align=center| 1
| align=center| 0:45
| Highland, California, United States
| 
|-
| Win
| align=center| 13–3–1
| Robbie Shamrock
| TKO (punches)
| Elite Warriors Championship
| 
| align=center| 2
| align=center| 0:20
| Portland, Oregon, United States
|Welterweight bout.
|-
| Loss
| align=center| 12–3–1
| Rob McCullough
| TKO (cut)
| WEC 21: Tapout
| 
| align=center| 1
| align=center| 1:52
| Highland, California, United States
| 
|-
| Win
| align=center| 12–2–1
| Phillip Wyman
| Submission (rear-naked choke)
| WEC 19: Undisputed
| 
| align=center| 1
| align=center| 3:18
| Lemoore, California, United States
| 
|-
| Loss
| align=center| 11–2–1
| Billy Evangelista
| TKO (punches and elbows)
| WEC 18: Unfinished Business
| 
| align=center| 2
| align=center| 2:06
| Lemoore, California, United States
| 
|-
| Draw
| align=center| 11–1–1
| Diego Saraiva
| Draw
| Absolute Fighting Championships 14
| 
| align=center| 2
| align=center| 5:00
| Fort Lauderdale, Florida, United States
| 
|-
| Win
| align=center| 11–1
| Adam Torres
| Submission (armbar)
| KOTC: Execution Day
| 
| align=center| 1
| align=center| 3:50
| Reno, Nevada, United States
| 
|-
| Win
| align=center| 10–1
| Adam Torres
| Submission (armbar)
| UCF: Night of Champions
| 
| align=center| N/A
| align=center| N/A
| Medford, Oregon, United States
|Return to Lightweight.
|-
| Win
| align=center| 9–1
| Ed Nuno
| TKO (doctor stoppage)
| SF 11: Rumble at the Rose Garden
| 
| align=center| 3
| align=center| 3:28
| Portland, Oregon, United States
|Welterweight debut.
|-
| Win
| align=center| 8–1
| Nathan Wheelock
| TKO (punches)
| UCF: Battle at the Border 2
| 
| align=center| 2
| align=center| N/A
| Medford, Oregon, United States
| 
|-
| Loss
| align=center| 7–1
| Mark Castle
| Decision (split)
| FCFF: Rumble at the Roseland 8
| 
| align=center| 2
| align=center| 5:00
| Oregon, United States
| 
|-
| Win
| align=center| 7–0
| Rex Payne
| KO (punch)
| FCFF: Rumble at the Roseland 7
| 
| align=center| 1
| align=center| N/A
| Portland, Oregon, United States
| 
|-
| Win
| align=center| 6–0
| Eddy Ellis
| Submission (armbar)
| Ultimate Ring Challenge 3
| 
| align=center| 1
| align=center| 1:23
| Kelso, Washington, United States
| 
|-
| Win
| align=center| 5–0
| Mike Jonet
| KO (punch)
| FCFF: Rumble at the Roseland 5
| 
| align=center| 2
| align=center| 0:24
| Oregon, United States
| 
|-
| Win
| align=center| 4–0
| Olaf Alfonso
| TKO (corner stoppage)
| Desert Brawl 5
| 
| align=center| 1
| align=center| N/A
| Bend, Oregon, United States
| 
|-
| Win
| align=center| 3–0
| Austin Lawrence
| TKO (punches)
| FCFF: Rumble at the Roseland 4
| 
| align=center| 2
| align=center| 1:43
| Oregon, United States
| 
|-
| Win
| align=center| 2–0
| Brad Blackburn
| Decision (split)
| FCFF: Rumble at the Roseland 3
| 
| align=center| 2
| align=center| 5:00
| Oregon, United States
| 
|-
| Win
| align=center| 1–0
| Dennis Harada
| Submission
| FCFF: Rumble at the Roseland 2
| 
| align=center| 2
| align=center| N/A
| Oregon, United States
|

References

Living people
Sportspeople from Portland, Oregon
1983 births
American male mixed martial artists
Mixed martial artists utilizing boxing
Mixed martial artists utilizing wrestling